Laws governing lesbian, gay, bisexual, and transgender (LGBT) rights are complex in the Americas, and acceptance of LGBT persons varies widely.

Same-sex marriages are currently legal in Argentina, Brazil, Canada, Chile, Colombia, Costa Rica, Cuba, Ecuador, Mexico, United States and Uruguay. Among non-independent states, same-sex marriage is also legal in Greenland, the British Overseas Territories of the Falkland Islands and South Georgia and the South Sandwich Islands, all French territories (Guadeloupe, Martinique, Saint Barthélemy, French Guiana, Saint Martin, and Saint Pierre and Miquelon), and in the Caribbean Netherlands, while marriages performed in the Netherlands are recognized in Aruba, Curaçao and Sint Maarten. More than 800 million people live in nations or sub-national entities in the Americas where same-sex marriages are available.

In January 2018, the Inter-American Court of Human Rights ruled that the American Convention on Human Rights recognizes same-sex marriage as a human right. This has made the legalization of such unions mandatory in the following countries: Barbados, Bolivia, Chile, Costa Rica, the Dominican Republic, Ecuador, El Salvador, Guatemala, Haiti, Honduras, Mexico, Nicaragua, Panama, Paraguay, Peru, and Suriname. Argentina, Brazil, Colombia, and Uruguay are also under the court's jurisdiction, but already had same-sex marriage before the ruling was handed down.

However, six other nations still have criminal punishment for "buggery" on their statute books. These are Dominica, Grenada, Guyana, Jamaica, Saint Lucia, and Saint Vincent and the Grenadines, of which Guyana is on mainland South America, while the rest are Caribbean islands. They are all former parts of the British West Indies.

Religion and LGBT acceptance

The British, French, Spanish and Portuguese colonists, who settled most of the Americas, brought Christianity from Europe. In particular, the Roman Catholic Church and the Protestants, both of which oppose legal recognition of homosexual relationships. These were followed by the Eastern Orthodox church, the Methodist Church, and some other Mainline (Protestant) denominations, such as the Reformed Church in America and the American Baptist Church, as well as conservative evangelical organizations and churches, such as the Evangelical Alliance and the Southern Baptist Convention. Pentecostal churches, such as the Assemblies of God, as well as restorationist churches (like Jehovah's Witnesses and Mormons), also take the position that homosexual sexual activity is ‘sinful’.

However, other denominations have become more accepting of LGBT people in recent decades, including the Episcopalian church in the United States, the Evangelical Lutheran Church (also in America), the Evangelical Lutheran Church of Canada, the Anglican Church of Canada, the United Church of Canada, the United Church of Christ, the Unitarian Universalist Association, and the Society of Friends (Quakers), as well as some congregations of the Presbyterian Church in America.  Most of these denominations now perform same-sex weddings or blessings. Furthermore, many churches in the United Methodist Church (in the US) are choosing to officiate and bless same-sex marriage despite denomination-wide restrictions. In addition, in the United States, conservative Judaism, reform Judaism, and reconstructionist Judaism now welcome LGBT worshippers and perform same-sex weddings.

Public opinion

Same-sex marriage

See also

LGBT rights in Africa
LGBT rights in Asia
LGBT rights in Europe
LGBT rights in Oceania
Recognition of same-sex unions in the Americas
Same-sex marriage in tribal nations in the United States
Travesti (gender identity)

Notes

References

Further reading
 Corrales, J. (2021). The Politics of LGBT Rights Expansion in Latin America and the Caribbean. Cambridge University Press.
Díez, Jordi. The politics of gay marriage in Latin America: Argentina, Chile, and Mexico (Cambridge University Press, 2015).
Dion, Michelle L., and Jordi Díez. "Democratic values, religiosity, and support for same-sex marriage in Latin America." Latin American Politics and Society 59.4 (2017): 75–98.
 Encarnación, Omar G. "Latin America's gay rights revolution." Journal of Democracy 22.2 (2011): 104–118.
 Encarnación, Omar Guillermo. Out in the periphery: Latin America's gay rights revolution ( Oxford University Press, 2016).
 Navarro, María Camila, et al. "Tolerance of Homosexuality in South American Countries: A Multilevel Analysis of Related Individual and Sociocultural Factors." International Journal of Sexual Health (2019): 1–12.